The monkey and banana problem is a famous toy problem in artificial intelligence, particularly in logic programming and planning.

Formulation of the problem
A monkey is in a room. Suspended from the ceiling is a bunch of bananas, beyond the monkey's reach. However, in the room there are also a chair and a stick. The ceiling is just the right height so that a monkey standing on a chair could knock the bananas down with the stick. The monkey knows how to move around, carry other things around, reach for the bananas, and wave a stick in the air. What is the best sequence of actions for the monkey?

Purpose of the problem
The problem seeks to answer the question of whether monkeys are intelligent. Both humans and monkeys have the ability to use mental maps to remember things like where to go to find shelter, or how to avoid danger. They can also remember where to go to gather food and water, as well as how to communicate with each other. Monkeys have the ability not only to remember how to hunt and gather but to learn new things, as is the case with the monkey and the bananas: despite the fact that the monkey may never have been in an identical situation, with the same artifacts at hand, a monkey is capable of concluding that it needs to make a ladder, position it below the bananas, and climb up to reach for them.

The degree to which such abilities should be ascribed to instinct or learning is a matter of debate.

In 1984, a pigeon was observed as having the capacity to solve a problem.

Software solutions
The problem is used as a toy problem for computer science. It can be solved with an expert system such as CLIPS. The example set of rules that CLIPS provides is somewhat fragile in that naive changes to the rulebase that might seem to a human of average intelligence to make common sense can cause the engine to fail to get the monkey to reach the banana.

Other examples exist using Rules Based System (RBS) a project implemented in Python.

See also
Tool use by animals

References

Logic puzzles